Robert Howden (died ca. 1397) was an English politician.

He was a Member (MP) of the Parliament of England for Nottingham in May 1382, February 1383 and 1386.

References

Year of birth missing
1397 deaths
English MPs May 1382
English MPs February 1383
English MPs 1386